Pacula or Pacuła is a Polish surname. Notable people with this surname include:

 Ewa Pacuła (born 1971), Polish model and television personality
 Ireneusz Pacula (born 1966), Polish ice hockey player
 Joanna Pacuła (born 1957), Polish-American actress and model
 Tadeusz Pacuła (1932–1984), Polish basketball player

See also
 

Polish-language surnames